Hidden Fear is a 1957 American film noir crime film directed by Andre DeToth, starring John Payne. It was filmed on location in Copenhagen, Denmark.

Plot
Mike Brent is an American police detective. When his sister is arrested on a charge of murder in Denmark, Mike rushes to prove her innocence.

Cast
 John Payne as Mike Brent
 Alexander Knox as Hartman
 Conrad Nagel as Arthur Miller
 Natalie Norwick as Susan Brent
 Anne Neyland as Virginia Kelly
 Kjeld Jacobsen as Lt. Egon Knudsen
 Paul Erling as Gibbs
 Marianne Schleiss as Helga Hartman
 Mogens Brandt as Lund
 Knud Rex as Jacobsen
 Elsie Albiin as Inga
 Buster Larsen as Hans Ericksen
 Preben Mahrt as Danish Detective
 Kjeld Petersen as Jensen

See also
 List of American films of 1957

References

External links
 
 
 

1957 films
1957 crime films
American crime films
American black-and-white films
Danish crime films
English-language Danish films
United Artists films
Films directed by Andre DeToth
Films set in Copenhagen
Films shot in Copenhagen
1950s English-language films
1950s American films